A captive threaded fastener may refer to:
 Cage nut
 Clip-on nut
 Rivet nut
 Threaded insert